N,N-Dimethyl-2-chloro-2-phenylethylamine (DMEA) is chemical compound that irreversibly inhibits the acetylcholinesterase. DMEA can cause intoxication in cats, resulting from respiratory failure to death, and progressive damage to the central nervous system in rats. Synthesis of DMEA can be obtained by treating N,N-dimethyl-2-hydroxy-2-phenylethylamine with thionyl chloride (SOCl2). This compound, when dissolved water, decomposes into a highly reactive aziridinium ion, N,N-dimethyl-2-phenylaziridinium (DPA). DPA binds to the anionic site of acetylcholinesterase, where it alkylates and irreversibly inhibits the enzyme. DMEA was also compared to N, N-dimethyl, 2-chloro-2-phenyl-1-methylethyl-amine (M-DMEA) and the results show that there is a difference between the degree of adrenergic blocking activity and their immonium ring stability in vitro.

See also
Acetylcholinesterase inhibitor

References

Acetylcholinesterase inhibitors
Nitrogen mustards
Phenethylamines
Organochlorides